Dichroa is a genus of 12 species of flowering plants in the family Hydrangeaceae, native to eastern and southeastern Asia. They are deciduous shrubs growing to 1–3 m tall, with their leaves arranged in opposite pairs. The flowers are produced in a broad inflorescence similar to that of the related genus Hydrangea. The fruit is a glossy metallic purple-blue berry.

Dichroa febrifuga (Chinese: 常山; pinyin: chángshān) is an important herb in traditional Chinese medicine, where it is considered one of the 50 fundamental herbs.

Selected species
Dichroa daimingshanensis Y.C.Wu
Dichroa febrifuga Lour.
Dichroa hirsuta Gagnep.
Dichroa mollissima Merrill
Dichroa versicolour
Dichroa yaoshanensis Y.C.Wu
Dichroa yunnanensis S.M.Hwang

References

Footnotes

General references
UBC Botany Photos: Dichroa febrifuga
Plants for a Future: Dichroa febrifuga

Hydrangeaceae
Cornales genera
Medicinal plants of Asia